The Old Crown Inn is a grade II listed pub house at 81 and 83 Westgate Street, Gloucester.

References

External links

Grade II listed pubs in Gloucestershire
Pubs in Gloucester
Westgate, Gloucester
Pubs in Gloucestershire